Ranga Vilas is a 2013 soap opera starring Jayachitra, Radha Ravi, Vadivukkarasi, Delhi Kumar, Poovilangu Mohan, Sailatha, Sathish, Anuradha Krishnamurthy and directed by Mani Bharathi. It premiered on Jaya TV every Monday to Friday at 21:00 (IST) on 9 September 2013 to 14 February 2014 for 109 episodes. The show focuses on a fictional Iyengar family in Srirangam.

Cast

Main Cast
 Jayachitra
 Radha Ravi
 Vadivukkarasi
 Delhi Kumar
 Poovilangu Mohan
 Anuradha Krishnamurthy as Rajam

Supporting
 Sailatha as Nanthini
 Sathish
 Udhay as Santhosh
 Tharunkumar
 Rani as Varalakshmi alias Varu
 Kumareshan
 Mahalakshmi  as Ishaka
 Sri Vithiya
 Rekha Suresh

Casting
The series is an Iyengar family melodrama with Jayachitra playing the lead female role. Jayachitra making her comeback after 15 years, and Radha Ravi, Vadivukkarasi, Delhi Kumar, Poovilangu Mohan and Anuradha Krishnamurthy in a lead role. Sailatha, who appeared in leading roles in the series Maharasi, Snehethy, Uravukku Kai Koduppom will portray an important role. Sathish, Udhay, Mahalakshmi, Rani and Sri Vithiya was selected to the Important roles.

References

External links
official website 
Jaya TV on Youtube

Jaya TV television series
2010s Tamil-language television series
2013 Tamil-language television series debuts
Tamil-language television shows
2014 Tamil-language television series endings